The 1998 Chinese Jia-A League (known as Marlboro Jia-A League for sponsorship reasons) was the fifth season of professional association football and the 37th top-tier overall league season held in China. The league was expanded to 14 teams and started on March 22nd 1998 and ending on October 25th 1998 where it saw Dalian Wanda win their third consecutive league title.

Promotion and relegation
Teams promoted from 1997 Chinese Jia-B League
Wuhan Yaqi (Renamed Wuhan Hongjinlong)
Shenzhen Pingan
Shenyang Haishi
Guangzhou Songri

Teams relegated from 1997 Chinese Jia-A League
Tianjin Lifei
Guangdong Hongyuan

League standings

Awards
Player of the year (Golden Ball Award)
Hao Haidong (Dalian Wanda)

Top scorer (Golden Boot Award)
Hao Haidong (Dalian Wanda)

Manager of the year
Xu Genbao (Dalian Wanda)

Best Referee
Lu Jun (Beijing)

See also
Chinese Jia-A League
Chinese Super League
Chinese Football Association Jia League
Chinese Football Association Yi League
Chinese FA Cup
Chinese Football Association
Football in China
List of football records in China
Chinese clubs in the AFC Champions League

References
China - List of final tables (RSSSF)

Chinese Jia-A League seasons
1
China
China
1998 establishments in China